The First Historical Archives of China (FHAC) is home to many historical documents managed by the National Archives Administration of China. The First Historical Archives of China is located in Beijing and has China's central government archives of Ming and Qing dynasties.

References

Citations

Sources 

 First Historical Archives of China, Eugenio Menegon, Zhang Xianqing 2002.

External links
 

Archives in China
China